Zaynab al-Ghazali (2 January 1917 – 3 August 2005) was an Egyptian Muslim activist. She was the founder of the Muslim Women's Association (Jamaa'at al-Sayyidaat al-Muslimaat).

Biography

Early life
Her father was educated at al-Azhar University, an independent religious teacher and cotton merchant. He encouraged her to become an Islamic leader citing the example of Nusayba bint Ka'b al-Muzaniyya, a woman who fought alongside Prophet Muhammad in the Battle of Uhud. For a short time during her teens, she joined the Egyptian Feminist Union only to conclude that "Islam gave women rights in the family granted by no other society. At the age of eighteen, she founded the Jama'at al-Sayyidat al-Muslimat (Muslim Women's Association), which she claimed had a membership of three million throughout the country by the time it was dissolved by government order in 1964.

Allegiance to Hassan al-Banna
Hassan al-Banna, the founder of the Muslim Brotherhood, invited al-Ghazali to merge her organisation with his, an invitation she refused as she wished to retain autonomy. However, she did eventually take an oath of personal loyalty to al-Banna. (Mahmood 2005: 68) The fact that her organisation was not formally affiliated with the Muslim Brotherhood was to prove useful after the Ikhwan was banned, as for a time al-Ghazali was able to continue to distribute their literature and host their meetings in her home.

Theory 
Zeinab al-Ghazali promulgated a feminism that was inherently Islamic. She believed in a "notion of habituated learning through practical knowledge" of Islam and the Qu'ran, and felt that women's liberation, economic rights, political rights, etc. could be achieved through a more intimate understanding of Islam. al-Ghazali also believed that a woman's primary responsibility was within the home, but that she should also have the opportunity to participate in political life if she so chose. al-Ghazali's Patriarchal Islamist stance allowed her to publicly disagree with several issues that "put her at odds with male Islamist leaders".

Muslim Women's Association
Her weekly lectures to women at the Ibn Tulun Mosque drew a crowd of three thousand, which grew to five thousand during holy months of the year. Besides offering lessons for women, the association published a magazine, maintained an orphanage, offered assistance to poor families, and mediated family disputes. 

Some scholars, like Leila Ahmed, Miriam Cooke, M. Qasim Zaman, and Roxanne Euben argue that al-Ghazali's own actions stand at a distance, and even undercuts some of her professed beliefs. To these scholars, among many, her career is one which resists conventional forms of domesticity, while her words, in interviews, publications, and letters define women largely as wives and mothers.

In justifying her own exceptionality to her stated belief in a woman's rightful role, al-Ghazali described her own childlessness as a "blessing" that would not usually be seen as such, because it freed her to participate in public life. (Hoffman 1988). Her second husband died while she was in prison, having divorced her after government threats to confiscate his property. Al-Ghazali's family were angered at this perceived disloyalty, but al-Ghazali herself remained loyal to him, writing in her memoir that she asked for his photograph to be reinstated in their home when told that it had been removed.

Life in prison and release
After the assassination of Hassan al-Banna in 1949, al-Ghazali was instrumental in regrouping the Muslim Brotherhood in the early 1960s. Imprisoned for her activities in 1965, she was sentenced to twenty-five years of hard labor but was released under Anwar Sadat's Presidency in 1971.

During her imprisonment, Zainab al-Ghazali and members of the Muslim Brotherhood underwent inhumane torture. Al-Ghazali recounts being thrown into a cell locked up with dogs to confess an assassination attempt on President Nassir. During these periods of hardship, she is reported to have had visions of Muhammed. Some miracles were also experienced by her, as she got food, refuge and strength during those difficult times.
 
After her release from prison, al-Ghazali resumed teaching. In the period 1976–1978, she published articles in Al Dawa which was restarted by the Muslim Brotherhood in 1976. She was editor of a women's and children's section in Al Dawa, in which she encouraged women to become educated, but to be obedient to their husbands and stay at home while rearing their children. She wrote a book based on her experience in jail.

Memoir
She describes her prison experience, which included torture, in a book entitled Ayyām min ḥayātī, published in English as Days from My Life by Hindustan Publications in 1989 and as Return of the Pharaoh by the Islamic Foundation (UK) in 1994. The "Pharaoh" referred to is President Nasser. Al-Ghazali depicts herself as enduring torture with strength beyond that of most men, and she attests to both miracles and visions that strengthened her and enabled her to survive. The Philosopher Sayed Hassan Akhlaq published an essay review about the book along with some critical points.

Legacy
Zaynab al-Ghazali was also a writer, contributing regularly to major Islamic journals and magazines on Islamic and women's issues. Although the Islamic movement throughout the Muslim world today has attracted a large number of young women, especially since the 1970s, Zaynab al-Ghazali stands out thus far as the only woman to distinguish herself as one of its major leaders.

References

Further reading 
al-Ghazali Return of the Pharaoh, The Islamic Foundation 2006
 Hoffman, Valerie. "An Islamic Activist: Zaynab alGhazali." In Women and the Family in the Middle East, edited by Elizabeth W. Fernea. Austin: University of Texas Press, 1985.
 Mahmood, Saba, Politics of Piety: The Islamic Revival and the Feminist Subject, Princeton University Press 2005

External links

1917 births
2005 deaths
Egyptian Muslims
Egyptian Muslim Brotherhood members
Muslim Brotherhood women
Al-Azhar University alumni
Female Islamic religious leaders
Women scholars of Islam
20th-century Egyptian women politicians
20th-century Egyptian politicians
Egyptian prisoners and detainees